The Liechtenstein national under-19 football team is the national under-19 football team of Liechtenstein and is controlled by the Liechtenstein Football Association. The team competes in the UEFA European Under-19 Football Championship, held every year.

U19 European Championship record

References

See also 
 Liechtenstein national football team
 Liechtenstein national under-21 football team
 Liechtenstein national under-17 football team

Under-19
European national under-19 association football teams